Eastern Karnic language may be,

The ISO reference name for those purported Ngura "languages" of Australia that do not have sufficient attested data to be established as actual languages,
One of the Eastern Karnic languages of Australia, such as Garlali, Wangkumara and Bundhamara, which have been assigned distinct ISO codes.